The 2013 USA Women's Sevens – the first edition of the component of the IRB Women's Sevens World Series tournament USA Women's Sevens designed for the female national teams in the Rugby 7s. It was held between February 1 to 2, 2013 for BBVA Compass Stadium in Houston as it was the second stop of the 2012–13 IRB Women's Sevens World Series.

England took home their first win of the season after defeating the host USA 29–12.

Format 
The teams were drawn into three pools of four teams each. Each team played everyone in their pool one time. The top two teams from each pool advanced to the Cup/Plate brackets. The bottom two teams from each group went to the Bowl brackets.

Pool stage

Group A

Group B

Group C

Knockout stage

Bowl

Plate

Cup

References

External links
Official website

2013
2012–13 IRB Women's Sevens World Series
2013 in women's rugby union
2013 in American rugby union
rugby union
2013 rugby sevens competitions